The American Enterprise Institute for Public Policy Research, known simply as the American Enterprise Institute (AEI), is a center-right think tank based in Washington, D.C., that researches government, politics, economics, and social welfare. AEI is an independent nonprofit organization supported primarily by contributions from foundations, corporations, and individuals. Founded in 1938, the organization is aligned with conservatism and neoconservatism but does not support political candidates. AEI advocates in favor of private enterprise, limited government, and democratic capitalism.
 
AEI is governed by a 28-member Board of Trustees, composed of executives and former executives from various corporations. Approximately 185 authors are associated with AEI. Arthur C. Brooks served as president of AEI from January 2009 through July 1, 2019. He was succeeded by Robert Doar.

Members

AEI scholars or affiliates have included President Gerald Ford, William J. Baroody Jr., William J. Baroody Sr., Robert Bork, Arthur F. Burns, Ronald Coase, Dinesh D'Souza, Alfred de Grazia, Christopher DeMuth, Martin Feldstein, Milton Friedman, David Frum, Reuel Marc Gerecht, David Gergen, Newt Gingrich, James K. Glassman, Jonah Goldberg, Jeane Kirkpatrick, Irving Kristol, Michael Ledeen, Seymour Martin Lipset, John Lott, James C. Miller III, Joshua Muravchik, Michael Novak, Richard Perle, Roscoe Pound, Laurence Silberman, Antonin Scalia, Ben Wattenberg, and James Q. Wilson.

AEI staff members were considered to be among the leading architects of the Bush administration's public and foreign policy. More than 20 staff members served either in a Bush administration policy post or on one of the government's many panels and commissions. Among the prominent former government officials now affiliated with AEI are: AEI Board of Trustees member Dick Cheney, vice president of the United States under George W. Bush; John R. Bolton, former Ambassador to the United Nations; Lynne Cheney, former chair of the National Endowment for the Humanities; and Paul Wolfowitz, former Deputy Secretary of Defense.

Political stance and impact
The institute is a right-leaning counterpart to the left-leaning Brookings Institution; however, the two entities have often collaborated. From 1998 to 2008, they co-sponsored the AEI-Brookings Joint Center for Regulatory Studies, and in 2006 they launched the AEI-Brookings Election Reform Project. In 2015, a working group consisting of members from both institutions coauthored a report entitled Opportunity, Responsibility, and Security: A Consensus Plan for Reducing Poverty and Restoring the American Dream.

AEI is the most prominent think tank associated with American neoconservatism, in both the domestic and international policy arenas. Irving Kristol, widely considered to be one of the founding fathers of neoconservatism, was a senior fellow at AEI (arriving from the Congress for Cultural Freedom following the revelation of that group's CIA funding) and the AEI issues a 'Irving Kristol Award' in his honour. Many prominent neoconservatives—including Jeane Kirkpatrick, Ben Wattenberg, and Joshua Muravchik—spent the bulk of their careers at AEI. Paul Ryan has described the AEI as "one of the beachheads of the modern conservative movement".

According to the 2011 Global Go To Think Tank Index Report (Think Tanks and Civil Societies Program, University of Pennsylvania), AEI is number 17 in the "Top Thirty Worldwide Think Tanks" and number 10 in the "Top Fifty United States Think Tanks". As of 2019, the American Enterprise Institute also leads in YouTube subscribers among free-market groups.

History

Beginnings (1938–1954)
AEI grew out of the American Enterprise Association (AEA), which was founded in 1938 by a group of New York businessmen led by Lewis H. Brown. AEA's original mission was to promote a "greater public knowledge and understanding of the social and economic advantages accruing to the American people through the maintenance of the system of free, competitive enterprise". AEI's founders included executives from Eli Lilly, General Mills, Bristol-Myers, Chemical Bank, Chrysler, and Paine Webber.

In 1943, AEA's main offices were moved from New York City to Washington during a time when Congress's portfolio had vastly increased during World War II. AEA opposed the New Deal, and aimed to propound classical liberal arguments for limited government. In 1944, AEA convened an Economic Advisory Board to set a high standard for research; this eventually became the Council of Academic Advisers, which, over the decades, included notable economists and social scientists like Ronald Coase, Martin Feldstein, Milton Friedman, Roscoe Pound, and James Q. Wilson.

AEA's early work in Washington involved commissioning and distributing legislative analyses to Congress, which developed AEA's relationships with Melvin Laird and Gerald Ford. Brown eventually shifted AEA's focus to commissioning studies of government policies. These subjects ranged from fiscal to monetary policy and from health care to energy, and authors included Earl Butz, John Lintner, former New Dealer Raymond Moley, and Felix Morley. Brown died in 1951, and AEA languished. In 1952, a group of young policymakers and public intellectuals—including Laird, William J. Baroody Sr., Paul McCracken, and Murray Weidenbaum—met to discuss resurrecting AEI. In 1954, Baroody became executive vice president of the association.

William J. Baroody Sr. (1954–1980)
Baroody was executive vice president from 1954 to 1962 and president from 1962 to 1978. Baroody raised money for AEA to expand its financial base beyond the business leaders on the board. During the 1950s, and 1960s, AEA's work became described as more pointed and focused, including monographs by James M. Buchanan, Gottfried Haberler, Edward Banfield, Rose Friedman, P. T. Bauer and Alfred de Grazia.

In 1964, William J. Baroody Sr., and several of his top staff at AEI, including Karl Hess, moonlighted as policy advisers and speechwriters for Republican presidential nominee Barry Goldwater. "Even though Baroody and his staff sought to support Goldwater on their own time—without using the institution's resources—AEI came under close scrutiny from the IRS in the years following the campaign," Andrew Rich writes. Representative Wright Patman subpoenaed the institute's tax papers, and the IRS investigated for two years. After this, AEI's officers scrupulously attempted to avoid even the appearance of political advocacy.

The American Enterprise Institute (AEI)—which had been renamed in 1962—remained a marginal operation with little practical influence in the national politics until the 1970s. Baroody recruited a resident research faculty; Harvard economist Haberler was the first to join in 1972. In 1977, former president Gerald Ford joined AEI as its "distinguished fellow." Ford brought several of his administration's officials with him, including Arthur Burns, Robert Bork, David Gergen, James C. Miller III, Laurence Silberman, and Antonin Scalia. Ford also founded the AEI World Forum, which he hosted until 2005. Other staff hired around this time included Herbert Stein and Walter Berns. Baroody's son, William J. Baroody Jr., had been an official in the Ford White House and now also joined AEI, taking over the presidency from his father in 1978.

The elder Baroody made a concerted effort to recruit neoconservatives who had supported the New Deal and Great Society but had become disaffected by what they perceived as the failure of the welfare state. This also included Cold War hawks who rejected George McGovern's peace agenda. He brought Irving Kristol, Jeane Kirkpatrick, Michael Novak, and Ben Wattenberg to AEI. While at AEI, Kirkpatrick authored "Dictatorships and Double Standards"; it brought her to the attention of Ronald Reagan, and she was later named U.S. permanent representative to the United Nations. AEI also became a home for supply-side economists during the late 1970s and early 1980s. By 1980, AEI had grown from a budget of $1 million and a staff of ten to a budget of $8 million and a staff of 125.

William J. Baroody Jr. (1980–1986)
Baroody Sr. retired in 1978, and was replaced by his son, William J. Baroody Jr. Baroody Sr. died in 1980, shortly before Ronald Reagan took office as US president.

During the Reagan years, several AEI staff members decamped for the administration. That, combined with prodigious growth, diffusion of research activities, and managerial problems, proved costly. Some foundations then supporting AEI perceived a drift toward the center politically. Centrists like Ford, Burns, and Stein clashed with rising movement conservatives. In 1986, the John M. Olin Foundation and the Smith Richardson Foundation withdrew funding for the institute, pushing AEI to the brink of bankruptcy. The board of trustees fired Baroody Jr. and, after an interregnum under interim president Paul McCracken, hired Christopher DeMuth as president in December 1986. DeMuth stayed on for twenty-two years.

Christopher DeMuth (1986–2008)

In 1990, AEI hired Charles Murray (and received his Bradley Foundation support for The Bell Curve) after the Manhattan Institute dropped him. Others brought to AEI by DeMuth included John Bolton, Dinesh D'Souza, Richard Cheney, Lynne Cheney, Michael Barone, James K. Glassman, Newt Gingrich, John Lott, and Ayaan Hirsi Ali.

During the George H. W. Bush and Bill Clinton administrations, AEI's revenues grew from $10 million to $18.9 million. The institute's publications Public Opinion and The AEI Economist were merged into The American Enterprise, edited by Karlyn Bowman from 1990 to 1995 and by Karl Zinsmeister from 1995 to 2006, when Glassman created The American. DeMuth presided over AEI as it moved into the digital age.

AEI was closely tied to the George W. Bush administration. More than twenty AEI staff members served in the Bush administration, and Bush addressed the institute on three occasions. "I admire AEI a lot—I'm sure you know that", Bush said. "After all, I have been consistently borrowing some of your best people."

Cabinet officials also frequented AEI. In 2002, Danielle Pletka joined AEI to promote the foreign policy department. AEI and several of its staff—including Michael Ledeen and Richard Perle—became associated with the start of the Iraq War. President George W. Bush used a February 2003 AEI dinner to advocate for a democratized Iraq, which was intended to inspire the remainder of the Mideast. In 2006–07, AEI staff, including Frederick W. Kagan, provided a strategic framework for the 2007 surge in Iraq. The Bush administration also drew on AEI work in other areas, such as Leon Kass's appointment as the first chairman of the President's Council on Bioethics and Norman J. Ornstein's work drafting the Bipartisan Campaign Reform Act that Bush signed in 2002.

Arthur C. Brooks (2008–2019)
When DeMuth retired as president at the end of 2008, AEI's staff numbered 185, with 70 scholars and several dozen adjuncts, and revenues of $31.3 million. Arthur C. Brooks succeeded him as president at the start of the Late-2000s recession. In a 2009 op-ed in The Wall Street Journal, Brooks positioned AEI to be much more aggressive in responding to the policies of the Barack Obama administration. In 2018, Brooks announced that he would step down effective July 1, 2019.

Termination of David Frum's residency
On March 25, 2010, AEI resident fellow David Frum announced that his position at the organization had been "terminated." Following this announcement, media outlets speculated that Frum had been "forced out" for writing a post to his FrumForum blog called "Waterloo", in which he criticized the Republican Party's unwillingness to bargain with Democrats on the Patient Protection and Affordable Care Act. In the editorial, Frum claimed that his party's failure to reach a deal "led us to abject and irreversible defeat."

After his termination, Frum clarified that his article had been "welcomed and celebrated" by AEI President Arthur Brooks, and that he had been asked to leave because "these are hard times." Brooks had offered Frum the opportunity to write for AEI on a nonsalaried basis, but Frum declined. The following day, journalist Mike Allen published a conversation with Frum, in which Frum expressed a belief that his termination was the result of pressure from donors. According to Frum, "AEI represents the best of the conservative world... But the elite isn't leading anymore... I think Arthur [Brooks] took no pleasure in this. I think he was embarrassed."

Robert Doar (2019–present)
In January 2019, Robert Doar was selected by AEI's board of trustees to be the institute's 12th president, succeeding Arthur Brooks on July 1, 2019.

Personnel
AEI's officers include Robert Doar, Danielle Pletka, Yuval Levin, Michael R. Strain, and Ryan Streeter.

AEI has a Council of Academic Advisers, which includes Alan J. Auerbach, Eliot A. Cohen, Eugene Fama, Aaron Friedberg, Robert P. George, Eric A. Hanushek, Walter Russell Mead, Mark V. Pauly, R. Glenn Hubbard, Sam Peltzman, Harvey S. Rosen, Jeremy A. Rabkin, and Richard Zeckhauser. The Council of Academic Advisers selects the annual winner of the Irving Kristol Award.

Board of directors
AEI's board is chaired by Daniel A. D'Aniello. Current notable trustees include:
 Former vice president Dick Cheney
 John V. Faraci, chairman and CEO of International Paper
 Harlan Crow, chairman and CEO of Crow Holdings, the Trammell Crow family's investment company
 Christopher Galvin, former CEO and chairman of Motorola
 Harvey Golub, retired chairman and CEO of the American Express Company
Bruce Kovner, chairman of Caxton Alternative Associates (and a former chairman of AEI)
 Edward B. Rust Jr., chairman and CEO of State Farm (and also a former AEI chairman)
 Cliff Asness, hedge fund manager and the co-founder of AQR Capital Management
 Pete Coors, vice chairman of the board of Molson Coors Brewing Company
 Ravenel B. Curry III, president of Eagle Capital Management
 Dick DeVos, president of the Windquest Group
 Tully Friedman, chairman and CEO of Friedman Fleischer & Lowe 
 Robert F. Greenhill, founder and chairman of Greenhill & Co. 
 Frank Hanna III, CEO of Hanna Capital
 John A. Luke Jr., chairman and CEO of MeadWestvaco
 Kevin Rollins, former president and CEO of Dell
 Matthew K. Rose, executive chairman of BNSF Railway
 Mel Sembler, chairman emeritus of the Sembler Company

Research programs
AEI's research is divided into seven broad categories: economic policy studies, foreign and defense policy studies, health care policy studies, political and public opinion studies, social and cultural studies, education, and poverty studies. Until 2008, AEI's work was divided into economics, foreign policy, and politics and social policy. AEI research is presented at conferences and meetings, in peer-reviewed journals and publications on the institute's website, and through testimony before and consultations with government panels.

Economic policy studies
Economic policy was the original focus of the American Enterprise Association, and "the Institute still keeps economic policy studies at its core". According to AEI's annual report, "The principal goal is to better understand free economies—how they function, how to capitalize on their strengths, how to keep private enterprise robust, and how to address problems when they arise". Michael R. Strain directs economic policy studies at AEI. Throughout the beginning of the 21st-century, AEI staff have pushed for a more conservative approach to aiding the recession that includes major tax-cuts. AEI supported President Bush's tax cuts in 2002 and claimed that the cuts "played a large role in helping to save the economy from a recession". AEI also suggested that further taxes were necessary in order to attain recovery of the economy. An AEI staff member said that the Democrats in congress who opposed the Bush stimulus plan were foolish for doing so as he saw the plan as a major success for the administration.

Financial crisis of 2007–2008
As the financial crisis of 2007–2008 unfolded, The Wall Street Journal stated that predictions by AEI staff about the involvement of housing GSEs had come true. In the late 1990s, Fannie Mae eased credit requirements on the mortgages it purchased and exposed itself to more risk. Peter J. Wallison warned that Fannie Mae and Freddie Mac's public-private status put taxpayers on the line for increased risk.

"Because of the agencies' dual public and private form, various efforts to force Fannie Mae and Freddie Mac to fulfill their public mission at the cost of their profitability have failed—and will likely continue to fail", he wrote in 2001. "The only viable solution would seem to be full privatization or the adoption of policies that would force the agencies to adopt this course themselves."

Wallison ramped up his criticism of the GSEs throughout the 2000s. In 2006, and 2007, he moderated conferences featuring James B. Lockhart III, the chief regulator of Fannie and Freddie In August 2008, after Fannie and Freddie had been backstopped by the US Treasury Department, Wallison outlined several ways of dealing with the GSEs, including "nationalization through a receivership," outright "privatization," and "privatization through a receivership." The following month, Lockhart and Treasury Secretary Henry Paulson took the former path by putting Fannie and Freddie into federal "conservatorship." As the housing crisis unfolded, AEI sponsored a series of conferences featuring commentators including Desmond Lachman, and Nouriel Roubini. Makin had been warning about the effects of a housing downturn on the broader economy for months. Amid charges that many homebuyers did not understand their complex mortgages, Alex J. Pollock gained recognition for crafting a prototype of a one-page mortgage disclosure form.

Research in AEI's Financial Markets Program also includes banking, insurance and securities regulation, accounting reform, corporate governance, and consumer finance.

Tax and fiscal policy
Kevin Hassett and Alan D. Viard are AEI's principal tax policy experts, although Alex Brill, R. Glenn Hubbard, and Aparna Mathur also work on the subject. Specific subjects include "income distribution, transition costs, marginal tax rates, and international taxation of corporate income... the Pension Protection Act of 2006; dynamic scoring and the effects of taxation on investment, savings, and entrepreneurial activity; and options to fix the alternative minimum tax". Hassett has coedited several volumes on tax reform.

Viard edited a book on tax policy lessons from the Bush administration. AEI's working paper series includes developing academic works on economic issues. One paper by Hassett and Mathur on the responsiveness of wages to corporate taxation was cited by The Economist; figures from another paper by Hassett and Brill on maximizing corporate income tax revenue was cited by The Wall Street Journal.

Center for Regulatory and Market Studies
From 1998 to 2008, the Reg-Markets Center was the AEI-Brookings Joint Center for Regulatory Studies, directed by Robert W. Hahn. The center, which no longer exists, sponsored conferences, papers, and books on regulatory decision-making and the impact of federal regulation on consumers, businesses, and governments. It covered a range of disciplines. It also sponsored an annual Distinguished Lecture series. Past lecturers in the series have included William Baumol, Supreme Court Justice Stephen Breyer, Alfred Kahn, Sam Peltzman, Richard Posner, and Cass Sunstein.

Energy and environmental policy
AEI's work on climate change has been subject to controversy (see below). According to AEI, it "emphasizes the need to design environmental policies that protect not only nature but also democratic institutions and human liberty". When the Kyoto Protocol was approaching, AEI was hesitant to encourage the U.S. to join. In an essay from the AEI outlook series of 2007, the authors discuss the Kyoto Protocol and state that the United States "should be wary of joining an international emissions-trading regime". To back this statement, they point out that committing to the Kyoto emissions goal would be a significant and unrealistic obligation for the United States. In addition, they state that the Kyoto regulations would have an impact not only on governmental policies, but also the private sector through expanding government control over investment decisions. AEI staff said that "dilution of sovereignty" would be the result if the U.S. signed the treaty.

AEI has promoted carbon taxation as an alternative to cap-and-trade regimes. "Most economists believe a carbon tax (a tax on the quantity of CO2 emitted when using energy) would be a superior policy alternative to an emissions-trading regime," wrote Kenneth P. Green, Kevin Hassett, and Steven F. Hayward. "In fact, the irony is that there is a broad consensus in favor of a carbon tax everywhere except on Capitol Hill, where the 'T word' is anathema."

Other AEI staff have argued for similar policies. Thernstrom and Lane are codirecting a project on whether geoengineering would be a feasible way to "buy us time to make [the] transition [from fossil fuels] while protecting us from the worst potential effects of warming".

Green, who departed AEI in 2013, expanded its work on energy policy. He has hosted conferences on nuclear power and ethanol With Aparna Mathur, he evaluated Americans' indirect energy use to discover unexpected areas in which energy efficiencies can be achieved.

Foreign and defense policy studies
AEI's foreign and defense policy studies researchers focus on "how political and economic freedom—as well as American interests—are best promoted around the world". AEI staff have tended to be advocates of a hard U.S. line on threats or potential threats to the United States, including the Soviet Union during the Cold War, Saddam Hussein's Iraq, the People's Republic of China, North Korea, Iran, Syria, Venezuela, Russia, and terrorist or militant groups like al Qaeda and Hezbollah. Likewise, AEI staff have promoted closer U.S. ties with countries whose interests or values they view as aligned with America's, such as Israel, the Republic of China (Taiwan), India, Australia, Japan, Mexico, Colombia, the Philippines, the United Kingdom, and emerging post-Communist states such as Poland and Georgia.

AEI takes a pro-Israel stance. In 2015 it awarded Israeli Prime Minister Benjamin Netanyahu its 'Iriving Kristol Award'.

AEI's foreign and defense policy studies department, directed by Danielle Pletka, is the part of the institute most commonly associated with neoconservatism, especially by its critics. Prominent foreign-policy neoconservatives at AEI include Richard Perle, Gary Schmitt, and Paul Wolfowitz. John Bolton, often said to be a neoconservative, has said he is not one, as his primary focus is on American interests, not democracy promotion. Joshua Muravchik and Michael Ledeen spent many years at AEI, although they departed at around the same time as Reuel Marc Gerecht in 2008 in what was rumored to be a "purge" of neoconservatives at the institute, possibly "signal[ing] the end of [neoconservatism's] domination over the think tank over the past several decades", although Muravchik later said it was the result of personality and management conflicts.

U.S. national security strategy, defense policy, and the "surge"
In late 2006, the security situation in Iraq continued to deteriorate, and the Iraq Study Group proposed a phased withdrawal of U.S. troops and further engagement of Iraq's neighbors. Consulting with AEI's Iraq Planning Group, Frederick W. Kagan published an AEI report entitled Choosing Victory: A Plan for Success in Iraq calling for "phase one" of a change in strategy to focus on "clearing and holding" neighborhoods and securing the population; a troop escalation of seven Army brigades and Marine regiments; and a renewed emphasis on reconstruction, economic development, and jobs.

While the report was being drafted, Kagan and Keane were briefing President Bush, Vice President Cheney, and other senior Bush administration officials behind the scenes. According to Bob Woodward, "[Peter J.] Schoomaker was outraged when he saw news coverage that retired Gen. Jack Keane, the former Army vice chief of staff, had briefed the president on December 11 about a new Iraq strategy being proposed by the American Enterprise Institute, the conservative think tank. 'When does AEI start trumping the Joint Chiefs of Staff on this stuff?' Schoomaker asked at the next chiefs' meeting."

Kagan, Keane, and Senators John McCain and Joseph Lieberman presented the plan at a January 5, 2007, event at AEI. Bush announced the change of strategy on January 10 the idea having "won additional support among some officials as a result of a detailed study by Gen. Jack Keane, the former vice chief of staff at the Army, and Frederick W. Kagan, a military specialist, that was published by the American Enterprise Institute". Kagan authored three subsequent reports monitoring the progress of the surge.

AEI's defense policy researchers, who also include Schmitt and Thomas Donnelly, also work on issues related to the U.S. military forces' size and structure and military partnerships with allies (both bilaterally and through institutions such as NATO). Schmitt directs AEI's Program on Advanced Strategic Studies, which "analyzes the long-term issues that will impact America's security and its ability to lead internationally".

Area studies
Asian studies at AEI covers "the rise of China as an economic and political power; Taiwan's security and economic agenda; Japan's military transformation; the threat of a nuclear North Korea; and the impact of regional alliances and rivalries on U.S. military and economic relationships in Asia". AEI has published several reports on Asia.

Papers in AEI's Tocqueville on China Project series "elicit the underlying civic culture of post-Mao China, enabling policymakers to better understand the internal forces and pressures that are shaping China's future".

AEI's Europe program was previously housed under the auspices of the New Atlantic Initiative, which was directed by Radek Sikorski before his return to Polish politics in 2005. Leon Aron's work forms the core of the institute's program on Russia. AEI staff tend to view Russia as posing "strategic challenges for the West".

Mark Falcoff, now retired, was previously AEI's resident Latinamericanist, focusing on the Southern Cone, Panama, and Cuba. He has warned that the road for Cuba after Fidel Castro's rule or the lifting of the U.S. trade embargo would be difficult for an island scarred by a half-century of poverty and civil turmoil. Roger Noriega's focuses at AEI are on Venezuela, Brazil, the Mérida Initiative with Mexico and Central America, and hemispheric relations.

AEI has historically devoted significant attention to the Middle East, especially through the work of former resident scholars Ledeen and Muravchik. Pletka's research focus also includes the Middle East, and she coordinated a conference series on empowering democratic dissidents and advocates in the Arab World. In 2009, AEI launched the Critical Threats Project, led by Kagan, to "highlight the complexity of the global challenges the United States faces with a primary focus on Iran and al Qaeda's global influence". The project includes IranTracker.org, with contributions from Ali Alfoneh, Ahmad Majidyar and Michael Rubin, among others.

International organizations and economic development
For several years, AEI and the Federalist Society cosponsored NGOWatch, which was later subsumed into Global Governance Watch, "a web-based resource that addresses issues of transparency and accountability in the United Nations, NGOs, and related international organizations". NGOWatch returned as a subsite of Global Governance Watch, led by Jon Entine. AEI scholars focusing on international organizations includes John Bolton, the former U.S. ambassador to the United Nations, and John Yoo, who researches international law and sovereignty.

AEI's research on economic development dates back to the early days of the institute. P. T. Bauer authored a monograph on development in India in 1959, and Edward Banfield published a booklet on the theory behind foreign aid in 1970. Since 2001, AEI has sponsored the Henry Wendt Lecture in International Development, named for Henry Wendt, an AEI trustee emeritus and former CEO of SmithKline Beckman. Notable lecturers have included Angus Maddison and Deepak Lal.

Nicholas Eberstadt holds the Henry Wendt Chair, focusing on demographics, population growth and human capital development; he served on the federal HELP Commission.

Paul Wolfowitz, the former president of the World Bank, researches development policy in Africa.

Roger Bate focuses his research on malaria, HIV/AIDS, counterfeit and substandard drugs, access to water, and other problems endemic in the developing world.

Health policy studies
AEI scholars have engaged in health policy research since the institute's early days. A Center for Health Policy Research was established in 1974. For many years, Robert B. Helms led the health department. AEI's long-term focuses in health care have included national insurance, Medicare, Medicaid, pharmaceutical innovation, health care competition, and cost control.

The center was replaced in the mid-1980s with the Health Policy Studies Program, which continues to this day. The AEI Press has published dozens of books on health policy since the 1970s. Since 2003, AEI has published the Health Policy Outlook series on new developments in U.S. and international health policy. AEI also published "A Better Prescription" to outline their ideal plan to healthcare reform. In the report, a great amount of emphasis is placed on placing the money and control in the hands of the consumers and continuing the market-based system of healthcare. They also acknowledge that this form of healthcare "relies on financial incentives rather than central direction and control, and it recognizes that a one-size-fits-all approach will not work in a country as diverse as ours".

In 2009, AEI researchers were active in assessing the Obama administration's health care proposals.

Paul Ryan, then-minority point man for health care in the House of Representatives, delivered the keynote address at an AEI conference on five key elements of health reform: mandated universal coverage, insurance exchanges, the public plan option, medical practice and treatment, and revenue to cover federal health care costs.

AEI scholars have long argued against the tax break for employer-sponsored health insurance, arguing that it distorts insurance markets and limits consumer choices.

In the 2008 U.S. presidential election, John McCain advocated this plan while Barack Obama disparaged it; in 2009, however, members of the Obama administration indicated that lifting the exemption was "on the table." Dr. Scott Gottlieb, a medical doctor, has expressed concern about relatively unreliable comparative effectiveness research being used to restrict treatment options under a public plan. AEI publishes a series of monographs on Medicare reform, edited by Helms and Antos.

Roger Bate's work includes international health policy, especially pharmaceutical quality, HIV/AIDS, malaria, and multilateral health organizations. In 2008, Dora Akunyili, then Nigeria's top drug safety official, spoke at an AEI event coinciding with the launch of Bate's book Making a Killing. After undergoing a kidney transplant in 2006, Sally Satel expanded her work from drug addiction treatment and mental health to include studies of compensation systems that she argues would increase the supply of organs for transplant. In addition to their work on pharmaceutical innovation and FDA regulation, Gottlieb and John E. Calfee have examined vaccine and antiviral drug supplies in the wake of the 2009 flu pandemic.

Legal and constitutional studies
The AEI Legal Center for the Public Interest, formed in 2007 from the merger of the National Legal Center for the Public Interest, houses all legal and constitutional research at AEI. Legal studies have a long pedigree at AEI; the institute was in the vanguard of the law and economics movement in the 1970s and 1980s with the publication of Regulation magazine and AEI Press books. Robert Bork published The Antitrust Paradox with AEI support. Other jurists, legal scholars, and constitutional scholars who have conducted research at AEI include Walter Berns, Richard Epstein, Bruce Fein, Robert Goldwin, Antonin Scalia, and Laurence Silberman. Goldwin, assisted by Art Kaufman, William Schambra, and Robert A. Licht, edited the ten-volume "A Decade of Study of the Constitution" series from 1980 -90.

The AEI Legal Center sponsors the annual Gauer Distinguished Lecture in Law and Public Policy. Past lecturers include Stephen Breyer, George H. W. Bush, Christopher Cox, Douglas Ginsburg, Anthony Kennedy, Sandra Day O'Connor, Colin Powell, Ronald Reagan, William Rehnquist, Condoleezza Rice, Margaret Thatcher, and William H. Webster.

Ted Frank, the director of the AEI Legal Center, focuses on liability law and tort reform. Michael S. Greve focuses on constitutional law and federalism, including federal preemption. Greve is a fixture in the conservative legal movement. According to Jonathan Rauch, in 2005, Greve convened "a handful of free-market activists and litigators met in a windowless 11th-floor conference room at the American Enterprise Institute in Washington" in opposition to the legality of the Public Company Accounting Oversight Board. "By the time the meeting finished, the participants had decided to join forces and file suit... . No one paid much attention. But the yawning stopped on May 18, [2009,] when the Supreme Court announced it will hear the case."

Political and public opinion studies
AEI's "Political Corner" includes a range of political viewpoints, from the center-left Norman J. Ornstein to the conservative Michael Barone. The Political Corner sponsors the biannual Election Watch series, the "longest-running election program in Washington", featuring Barone, Ornstein, Karlyn Bowman, and—formerly—Ben Wattenberg and Bill Schneider, among others. Ornstein and Fortier (an expert on absentee and early voting) collaborate on a number of election- and governance-related projects, including the Election Reform Project and the Continuity of Government Commission, also jointly sponsored by AEI and Brookings, with Jimmy Carter and Alan Simpson as honorary co-chairmen. AEI and Brookings are sponsoring a project on election demographics called "The Future of Red, Blue, and Purple America", co-directed by Bowman and Ruy Teixeira.

AEI's work on political processes and institutions has been a central part of the institute's research programs since the 1970s. The AEI Press published a series of several dozen volumes in the 1970s and 1980s called "At the Polls"; in each volume, scholars would assess a country's recent presidential or parliamentary election. AEI scholars have been called upon to observe and assess constitutional conventions and elections worldwide. In the early 1980s, AEI scholars were commissioned by the U.S. government to monitor plebiscites in Palau, the Federated States of Micronesia, and the Marshall Islands.

Another landmark in AEI's political studies is After the People Vote. AEI's work on election reform continued into the 1990s and 2000s; Ornstein led a working group that drafted the Bipartisan Campaign Reform Act of 2002.

AEI published Public Opinion magazine from 1978 to 1990 under the editorship of Seymour Martin Lipset and Ben Wattenberg, assisted by Karlyn Bowman. The institute's work on polling continues with public opinion features in The American Enterprise and The American and Bowman's AEI Studies in Public Opinion.

Social and cultural studies
AEI's social and cultural studies program dates to the 1970s, when William J. Baroody Sr., perceiving the importance of the philosophical and cultural underpinnings of modern economics and politics, invited social and religious thinkers like Irving Kristol and Michael Novak to take up residence at AEI. Since then, AEI has sponsored research on a wide variety of issues, including education, religion, race and gender, and social welfare. AEI's previous president, Arthur C. Brooks, rose to prominence with survey analysis on philanthropy and happiness.

Supported by the Bradley Foundation, AEI has hosted since 1989 the Bradley Lecture Series, "which aims to enrich debate in the Washington policy community through exploration of the philosophical and historical underpinnings of current controversies". Notable speakers in the series have included Kristol, Novak, Allan Bloom, Robert Bork, David Brooks, Lynne Cheney, Ron Chernow, Tyler Cowen, Niall Ferguson, Francis Fukuyama, Eugene Genovese, Robert P. George, Gertrude Himmelfarb, Samuel P. Huntington (giving the first public presentation of his "clash of civilizations" theory in 1992), Paul Johnson, Leon Kass, Charles Krauthammer, Bernard Lewis, Seymour Martin Lipset, Harvey C. Mansfield, Michael Medved, Allan H. Meltzer, Edmund Morris, Charles Murray, Steven Pinker, Norman Podhoretz, Richard Posner, Jonathan Rauch, Andrew Sullivan, Cass Sunstein, Sam Tanenhaus, James Q. Wilson, John Yoo, and Fareed Zakaria.

Education
Education policy studies at AEI are directed by Frederick M. Hess, who has authored, coauthored, or edited a number of volumes based on major conferences held at AEI on subjects like urban school reform, school choice, No Child Left Behind, teacher qualification, "educational entrepreneurship," student loans, and education research.

Hess co-directs AEI's Future of American Education Project, whose working group includes Washington, D.C. schools chancellor Michelle Rhee and Michael Feinberg, the cofounder of KIPP. Hess works closely with Rhee: she has spoken at AEI on several occasions and appointed Hess to be one of two independent reform evaluators for the District of Columbia Public Schools. Hess coauthored Diplomas and Dropouts, a report on university graduation rates that was widely publicized in 2009. The report, along with other education-related projects, was supported by the Bill & Melinda Gates Foundation.

AEI is often identified as a supporter of vouchers, but Hess has been critical of school vouchers: "[I]t is by now clear that aggressive reforms to bring market principles to American education have failed to live up to their billing. ... In the school choice debate, many reformers have gotten so invested in the language of 'choice' that they seem to forget choice is only half of the market equation. Markets are about both supply and demand—and, while 'choice' is concerned with emboldening consumer demand, the real action when it comes to prosperity, productivity, and progress is typically on the supply side."

Funding
AEI's revenues for the fiscal year ending June 2015 were $84,616,388 against expenses of $38,611,315. In 2014, the charity evaluating service American Institute of Philanthropy gave AEI an "A−" grade in its CharityWatch "Top-Rated Charities" listing.

 AEI had received $960,000 from ExxonMobil. In 2010, AEI received a 2.5 million grant from the Donors Capital Fund, a donor-advised fund.

A 2013 study by Drexel University Sociologist Robert J. Brulle noted that AEI received $86.7 million between 2003 and 2010.

Controversies

Global warming
Some AEI staff and fellows have been critical of the Intergovernmental Panel on Climate Change (IPCC), the international scientific body tasked to evaluate the risk of climate change caused by human activity.

In February 2007, a number of sources, including the British newspaper The Guardian, reported that the AEI had sent letters to scientists offering $10,000 plus travel expenses and additional payments, asking them to critique the IPCC Fourth Assessment Report. This offer was criticized as bribery. The letters alleged that the IPCC was "resistant to reasonable criticism and dissent, and prone to summary conclusions that are poorly supported by the analytical work" and asked for essays that "thoughtfully explore the limitations of climate model outputs".

The Guardian reported that the AEI received $1.6 million in funding from ExxonMobil, and further notes that former ExxonMobil CEO Lee R. Raymond is the vice-chairman of AEI's board of trustees. This story was repeated by Newsweek, which drew criticism from its contributing editor Robert J. Samuelson because "this accusation was long ago discredited, and Newsweek shouldn't have lent it respectability." The Guardian article was disputed both by AEI and in an editorial in The Wall Street Journal.
The rebuttals claimed factual errors and distortions, noting the ExxonMobil funding was spread out over a ten-year period and totaled less than 1% of AEI's budget. The Wall Street Journal editorial stated: "AEI doesn't lobby, didn't offer money to scientists to question global warming, and the money it did pay for climate research didn't come from Exxon."

AEI denies that the organization is skeptical about global warming. Criticizing the story as part of a "climate inquisition" published in "the left-wing press", the AEI's Steven Hayward and Kenneth Green wrote in The Weekly Standard:

Statements by affiliated people
Former scholar Steven Hayward has described efforts to reduce global warming as being "based on exaggerations and conjecture rather than science". He has stated that "even though the leading scientific journals are thoroughly imbued with environmental correctness and reject out of hand many articles that don't conform to the party line, a study that confounds the conventional wisdom is published almost every week".

Likewise, former AEI scholar Kenneth Green has referred to efforts to reduce greenhouse gas emissions as "the positively silly idea of establishing global-weather control by actively managing the atmosphere's greenhouse-gas emissions", and endorsed Michael Crichton's novel State of Fear for having "educated millions of readers about climate science".

Christopher DeMuth, former AEI president, accepted that the earth has warmed in recent decades, but he stated that "it's not clear why this happened" and charged as well that the IPCC "has tended to ignore many distinguished physicists and meteorologists whose work casts doubt on the influence of greenhouse gases on global temperature trends". Fellow James Glassman also disputes the prevailing scientific opinion on climate change, having written numerous articles criticizing the Kyoto accords and climate science more generally for Tech Central Station. He supported the views of U.S. Senator Jim Inhofe (R-OK), who claims that "global warming is 'the greatest hoax ever perpetrated on the American people,'" and, like Green, cites Crichton's novel State of Fear, which "casts serious doubt on global warming and extremists who espouse it".

Joel Schwartz, an AEI visiting fellow, stated: "The Earth has indeed warmed during the last few decades and may warm further in the future. But the pattern of climate change is not consistent with the greenhouse effect being the main cause."

After Energy Secretary Steven Chu recommended painting roofs and roads white in order to reflect sunlight back into space and therefore reduce global warming, AEI's magazine The American endorsed the idea. It also stated that "ultimately we need to look more broadly at creative ways of reducing the harmful effects of climate change in the long run." The American editor-in-chief and fellow Nick Schulz endorsed a carbon tax over a cap and trade program in The Christian Science Monitor on February 13, 2009. He stated that it "would create a market price for carbon emissions and lead to emissions reductions or new technologies that cut greenhouse gases."

In October 2007, resident scholar and executive director of the AEI-Brookings Joint Center for Regulatory Studies Robert W. Hahn commented:

AEI visiting scholar N. Gregory Mankiw wrote in The New York Times in support of a carbon tax on September 16, 2007. He remarked that "there is a broad consensus. The scientists tell us that world temperatures are rising because humans are emitting carbon into the atmosphere. Basic economics tells us that when you tax something, you normally get less of it."

See also
 List of American Enterprise Institute scholars and fellows
 Francis Boyer Award
 Irving Kristol Award

References

External links
 
 Organizational Profile – National Center for Charitable Statistics (Urban Institute)
 
 EDIRC listing (provided by RePEc)
 
 

 
Political and economic think tanks in the United States
Foreign policy and strategy think tanks in the United States
Think tanks based in Washington, D.C.
Organizations established in 1938
Non-profit organizations based in Washington, D.C.
Conservative organizations in the United States
Neoconservatism
Advocacy groups in the United States
Climate change denial